Phantom Justice is a 1924 American silent crime film directed by Richard Thomas and written by Burnett Manley. The film stars Rod La Rocque, Garry O'Dell, Kathryn McGuire, Frederick Vroom, Lillian Leighton, and Frederick Moore. The film was released on February 17, 1924, by Film Booking Offices of America.

Plot
As described in a film magazine review, Kingsley, a criminal lawyer who often defends those he knows are guilty, visits a dentist. He is summoned thence by a gangster to where Goldie Harper has killed a man. The body is removed under Kingsley's instructions, but unknown to him it is buried in his yard. He defends Goldie successfully, but the body is found. Beatrice Brooks, his sweetheart who objects to his career of defending guilty thugs, is killed by crooks, and the police are about to arrest him. He then wakes up in the dentist's chair, having been in a dream. He resolves to change his business practices.

Cast

References

External links
 

1924 films
American crime films
1924 crime films
Film Booking Offices of America films
American silent feature films
American black-and-white films
1920s English-language films
1920s American films